The 1945 Penn Quakers football team was an American football team that represented the University of Pennsylvania as an independent during the 1945 college football season. In its eighth season under head coach George Munger, the team compiled a 6–2 record, was ranked No. 8 in the final AP Poll, and outscored opponents by a total of 237 to 88. The team played its home games at Franklin Field in Philadelphia.

Schedule

References

Penn
Penn Quakers football seasons
Penn Quakers football